Dzūkian dialect, known in academic works as Southern Aukštaitian dialect, is one of the three main sub-dialects of the Aukštaitian dialect of Lithuanian language. Dzūkian dialect is spoken in Dzūkija, southern Lithuania. Its most distinctive feature is replacing t, d before i, į, y, ie and č, dž with c and dz instead of ( – just, ( instead of  – size,  instead of  – to braid,  instead of  – guests). Since the region borders Slavic lands, the dialect has many Slavic loanwords and barbarisms.

References
 

Lithuanian dialects